Idmon distanti is a species of butterfly in the family Hesperiidae. It was described by Shepard in 1937. It is found in southern Burma, Thailand, Langkawi, Malaysia, Singapore, Borneo, Sipora, Siberut, Batoe, Sumatra and Nias.

References

Butterflies described in 1937
Ancistroidini